The 2013 Estonian Figure Skating Championships took place between 15 and 16 December 2012 in Tallinn. Skaters competed in the disciplines of men's singles, ladies' singles, and ice dancing on the senior, junior, and novice levels. The results were used to choose the teams to the 2013 World Championships and the 2013 European Championships.

Senior results

Men

Ladies

Ice dancing

Junior results
The 2013 Estonian Junior Figure Skating Championships took place between 1 and 3 February 2013 at the Tartu Lõunakeskuse Jäähall in Tartu.

Men

Ladies

Ice dancing

External links
 info
 2013 Estonian Championships results
 2013 Estonian Junior Championships results

2013
Figure Skating Championships,2013
2013 in figure skating
2012 in figure skating